Steve Ritchie is a businessman who was the CEO of Papa John's. He worked at Papa John's for over 23 years, holding multiple positions in the company's leadership throughout that time after starting to work for the company as an hourly worker.

Career 
Ritchie was promoted to the COO position at Papa John's in May 2014. He has been the company's president since July 2015.

Ritchie became the CEO of Papa John's after the company's founder, John Schnatter, stepped down as CEO at the end of 2017.

Ritchie has promised to change the culture of Papa John's by bringing in outside experts to audit current diversity policies and requiring workers to undergo bias and diversity training. He has been praised for taking steps to deal with the company's controversy over Schnatter. However, Schnatter has expressed concerns that Ritchie is not the right executive for Papa John's.

Ritchie joined the board of directors at Papa John's after a $200 million investment in the company from Starboard Value. He said that the investment would be used towards changing the culture of the company and product innovation.

References

Year of birth missing (living people)
Living people
American chief executives of food industry companies